This is a list of Iranian football transfers for the 2014 summer transfer window. Transfers of Iran Pro League is listed.

Rules and regulations 
The Iranian Football Clubs who participate in 2014–15 Iran Pro League are allowed to have up to maximum 35 players (including up to maximum 4 non-Iranian players) in their player lists, which will be categorized in the following groups:
 Up to maximum 18 adult (without any age limit) players
 Up to maximum 9 under-23 players (i.e. the player whose birth is after 1 January 1992).
 Up to maximum 8 under-21 players (i.e. the player whose birth is after 1 January 1994).

According to Iran Football Federation rules for 2014–15 Football Season, each Football Club is allowed to take up to maximum 6 new Iranian player from the other clubs who already played in the 2013–14 Iran Pro League season. In addition to these six new players, each club is allowed to take up to maximum 4 non-Iranian new players (at least one of them should be Asian) and up to 3 players from Free agent (who did not play in 2013–14 Iran Pro League season or doesn't list in any 2014–15 League after season's start). In addition to these players, the clubs are also able to take some new under-23 and under-21 years old players, if they have some free place in these categories in their player lists. Under-23 players should sign in transfer window but under-21 & under-19 players can be signed during the first mid-season.

Iran Pro League

Esteghlal 
Head coach: Amir Ghalenoei
Remaining Pro League quota: 0 

In:

Out:

Esteghlal Khuzestan 
Head coach: Abdollah Veisi
Remaining Pro League quota: 0 

In:

Out:

Foolad 
Head coach:  Dragan Skočić
Remaining Pro League quota: 4 

In:

Out:

Gostaresh Foulad 
Head coach: Mehdi Tartar
Remaining Pro League quota: 2 

In:

Out:

Malavan 
Head coach: Nosrat Irandoost
Remaining Pro League quota: 4 

In:

Out:

Naft Masjed Soleyman 
Head coach: Majid Bagherinia
Remaining Pro League quota: 1 

In:

Out:

Naft Tehran 
Head coach: Alireza Mansourian
Remaining Pro League quota: 0 

In:

Out:

Padideh 
Head coach: Alireza Marzban
Remaining Pro League quota: 0 

In:

Out:

Paykan 
Head coach: Mansour Ebrahimzadeh
Remaining Pro League quota: 0 

In:

Out:

Persepolis 
Head coach: Ali Daei
Remaining Pro League quota: 3 

In:

Out:

Rah Ahan 
Head coach: Hamid Estili
Remaining Pro League quota: 0 

In:

Out:

Saba Qom 
Head coach: Samad Marfavi
Remaining Pro League quota: 0 

In:

Out:

Saipa 
Head coach: Majid Jalali
Remaining Pro League quota: 1 

In:

Out:

Sepahan 
Head coach:  Zlatko Kranjčar
Remaining Pro League quota: 1 

In:

Out:

Tractor Sazi 
Head coach: Rasoul Khatibi
Remaining Pro League quota: 1 

In:

Out:

Zob Ahan 
Head coach: Yahya Golmohammadi
Remaining Pro League quota: 1 

In:

Out:

Azadegan League

Damash 
Head coach: Omid Harandi

In:

	
	

Out:

Mes Kerman 
Head coach: Akbar Misaghian

In:

Out:

Notes and references

Football transfers summer 2014
2014
Transfers